The 1981–82 Just Juice National Basketball League season was the tenth season of the National Basketball League formed in 1972.

The league was sponsored by Just Juice and Crystal Palace once again secured a double (League and Play Off's) but the Solent Stars easily won the National Cup.

Team changes
Three new teams were entered into the expanded 12 team first division. The three top teams from the previous season's second division; the Solent Stars, TCB Brighton and Liverpool were all admitted and Stockport Belgrade took the decision to move away from their fan base to the new Spectrum Arena in Warrington becoming Birchwood Warrington Vikings. Blackpool Pacemakers dropped out.

League standings

First Division

Second Division

Just Juice playoffs

Semi-finals

Final

Asda National Cup

Second round

Quarter-finals

Semi-finals

Final

References

See also
Basketball in England
British Basketball League
English Basketball League
List of English National Basketball League seasons

National Basketball League (England) seasons
 
British